Sigvard may refer to:

Sigvard Bernadotte (1907–2002), Swedish industrial designer
Sigvard Eklund (1911–2000), director of the International Atomic Energy Agency security council
Sigvard Ericsson (1930–2019), former speed skater
Sigvard Hultcrantz (1888–1955), Swedish sport shooter
Sigvard Johansson, Swedish sprint canoeist, competed in the mid-1950s
Sigvard Munk (1891–1983), Danish politician for the Social Democratic Party
Sigvard Sivertsen (1881–1963), Norwegian gymnast
Sigvard Thurneman (born 1908), the leader of the gang Sala gang (Salaligan)